Boris Hybner (5 August, 1941 – 2 April, 2016) was a Czech actor, director, and mime artist.

In 2010, Hybner won the Thalia Award.

Hybner died on 2 April 2016 at the age of 74 from an illness.

Selected filmography

References

External links

1941 births
2016 deaths
Czech mimes
Czech male actors
People from Vyškov
Recipients of the Thalia Award